Akeem Bernard Hunt (born February 22, 1993) is a gridiron football running back for the Ottawa Redblacks of the Canadian Football League (CFL). He was signed by the New York Giants as an undrafted free agent in 2015. He played college football at Purdue University. He also has played for the Houston Texans, Baltimore Ravens, Kansas City Chiefs, Tennessee Titans and Orlando Apollos of the Alliance of American Football (AAF).

Early years
Hunt attended and played high school football at Newton High School.

College career
During his college football career at Purdue, Hunt rushed for 2,035 yards on 371 carries with 11 rushing touchdowns, six receiving touchdowns, and three kick return touchdowns.

Collegiate statistics
Source:

Professional career

New York Giants
On May 8, 2015, Hunt signed with the New York Giants as an undrafted free agent. He was waived with an hamstring injury on September 2 and was placed on injured reserve the next day.

Baltimore Ravens
Hunt was signed to the Baltimore Ravens practice squad on October 13, 2015. He was released by the team on October 20.

Houston Texans
Hunt was signed to the Houston Texans practice squad on November 2, 2015. He was promoted to the active roster on November 21. On November 22, he made his NFL debut with two carries for four yards against the New York Jets. Overall, he finished the 2015 season with 17 carries for 96 rushing yards to go along with six receptions for 39 yards in seven games.

On September 3, 2016, Hunt was released by the Texans and signed to the practice squad the next day. On November 12, Hunt was promoted to the Texans' active roster. He finished the 2016 season with 20 carries for 109 rushing yards and three receptions for 29 yards in eight games.

On September 3, 2017, Hunt was waived by the Texans.

Kansas City Chiefs
On September 5, 2017, Hunt was signed to the Kansas City Chiefs' practice squad. He was promoted to the active roster on September 16, 2017. He appeared in 15 games, primarily on special teams, and recorded eight carries for 23 rushing yards and four receptions for 31 yards. He was placed on injured reserve on January 2, 2018 with an ankle injury.

Hunt was waived by the Chiefs on May 8, 2018 with a failed physical designation. After going unclaimed on waivers, he was placed on the physically unable to perform list. He was released with an injury settlement on June 20, 2018.

Orlando Apollos
In 2019, Hunt joined the Orlando Apollos of the Alliance of American Football. On March 2, 2019, Hunt rushed for his first career touchdown in professional football. Hunt saw sporadic usage over the 8 games played; some weeks Hunt was the leading running backs while others had him phased out of the offense altogether. Hunt was effective when used, averaging 5 yards per carry, and nearly 10 yards per reception. Across the 8 weeks of play prior to the league's suspension of operations, Hunt had 37 carries for 185 yards and a score, while catching 5 passes for 49 yards, as well as a two point conversion.

Tennessee Titans
On August 10, 2019, Hunt was signed by the Tennessee Titans. On August 30, 2019, Hunt was waived by the Titans.

Ottawa Redblacks
Hunt was signed by the Ottawa Redblacks of the Canadian Football League on December 9, 2019. He was placed on the suspended list on July 16, 2021.

References

External links
Houston Texans biography
Purdue Boilermakers biography

1993 births
Living people
People from Covington, Georgia
Sportspeople from the Atlanta metropolitan area
Players of American football from Georgia (U.S. state)
American football running backs
American football return specialists
Purdue Boilermakers football players
New York Giants players
Baltimore Ravens players
Houston Texans players
Kansas City Chiefs players
Orlando Apollos players
Tennessee Titans players
Ottawa Redblacks players